Ozyorny is an urban locality (an urban-type settlement) in Dukhovshchinsky District of Smolensk Oblast, Russia. Population:

References

Urban-type settlements in Smolensk Oblast